Penney is a common English surname.  

Penney may also refer to:

 J. C. Penney, American department store chain
 Penneys, Irish clothing store
 Penney Farms, Florida, U.S.
 Penney's game, a two-player coin tossing game

See also
 Penny (disambiguation)